The 2023 Jerusalem mayoral election will be held in October 2023 to elect the mayor of Jerusalem.

Background 
The election will be part of the 2023 Israeli municipal elections.

Mayor Moshe Lion and Opposition Leader Ofer Berkovitch are considered to be contemplating candidacies..

While both candidates have not yet declared, it is expected that Mayor Moshe Lion and resigning Opposition Leader Ofer Berkovitch will face each other in a rematch in the mayoral election, with The Jerusalem Post reporting Berkovitch is highly considering another campaign against the incumbent Mayor Lion. The issues of public transportation, the expansion of the Jerusalem Light Rail, real estate prices and development, highway repairs, and the rapidly spreading influence of Haredi Judaism in the city are widely expected to be key issues.

Mayor Moshe Lion's slight rise in popularity among East Jerusalem Arabs compared to prior mayors has been observed by analysts, with an April 2021 op-ed noting Arabs are expected to play a major role in the election, and another op-ed encouraging Arabs to become more politically active in the race for mayor and in elections for Jerusalem City Hall

The rapid growth of Jerusalem's Haredi population is expected to play an important role in the election, with Ofer Berkovitch arguing to keep Haredi educational institutions separate from traditionally secular neighborhoods. Noting the Haredi community's growth and rising influence, Berkovitch said, "Our goal is to improve the lives of all communities here – including the haredi population – but not at the expense of the rest of the city’s residents. For example, in Gilo, a few rooms inside the community center that are supposed to be used for activities open to all residents were turned into haredi kindergartens. And in Ramot, a local swimming pool was forced to close on Shabbat – these kinds of changes didn’t even take place when [Haredi] Uri Lupolianski was mayor, but they are now when Lion is. He hasn’t even succeeded in maintaining a status quo, which completely goes against promises he made before he was elected.”

The Jerusalem Light Rail is expected to be another key issue, with the aftermath of a three yearlong debate over The Light Rail's Blue Line on Emek Refaim in Katamon, four new planned lines, as well as plans for a cable car into Jerusalem's Old City, dividing voters. 

West Jerusalemites' debate over the acceptance or discomfort with the increasing numbers of high-rise towers, which opponents including Kiryat HaYovel's Yuvalim 2041 activist group, is another issue facing voters. The debate centers around whether the high-rise towers threaten the city's traditional character or not.

In early November 2022, Berkovitch announced his decision to step away from The City Council, noting, "It is still too early to talk about the issue of the next candidate for mayor...We will always need innovative ideas, integration of the young, creativity and, above all, keeping Jerusalem as a city for everyone."

Candidates

Potential 

 Ofer Berkovitch, City Councillor and 2018 mayoral candidate.
 Moshe Lion, Mayor of Jerusalem (2018-)

References 

2023 elections in Israel
Future elections in Asia
Mayoral elections in Jerusalem